Zhulong may refer to:

 Zhulong, Chuzhou (珠龙镇), town in Nanqiao District, Chuzhou, Anhui
 Zhulong, Longquan (住龙镇), town in Longquan, Zhejiang
 Zhulong (mythology) (燭龍), a mythical being in Chinese mythology)
 472235 Zhulong, a Trans-Neptunian Object named after 燭龍
 Pig dragon (Chinese 猪龍), a type of artifact known from ancient China